Bulcote is a civil parish in the Newark and Sherwood district of Nottinghamshire, England.  The parish contains 16 listed buildings that are recorded in the National Heritage List for England.  All the listed buildings are designated at Grade II, the lowest of the three grades, which is applied to "buildings of national importance and special interest".  The parish contains the village of Bulcote and the surrounding area.  Most of the listed buildings are houses, cottages and associated structures, and the others are a church, and a model farm and houses for its workers.


Buildings

References

Citations

Sources

 

Lists of listed buildings in Nottinghamshire